Saidu Mansaray (born 21 February 2001) is a Sierra Leonean footballer who plays as a defender for Bo Rangers and the Sierra Leone national team. He was named in Sierra Leone's squad for the 2021 Africa Cup of Nations, which will be held in January and February 2022.

References

External links

2001 births
Living people
Sierra Leonean footballers
Association football defenders
Wusum Stars players
Sierra Leone international footballers
2021 Africa Cup of Nations players